Dick's Picks Volume 16 is the 16th live album in the Dick's Picks series of releases by the Grateful Dead. It was recorded on November 8, 1969 (with one song from the previous night's show) at the Fillmore Auditorium in San Francisco, California.  It contains the first live performance of "Cumberland Blues". There is a monologue by someone not in the band during the song "Caution" shortly before the segue to "The Main Ten," who has never been definitively identified.

Enclosure

Included with the release is a single sheet of paper folded in half, yielding a four-page enclosure.  The front duplicates the cover of the CD, and the back features a rectangular color photograph of the band on horseback out in the countryside, riding away from the photographer.  Under this photo is a white stripe across the page above a circular grey outline of a circular stealie skull with the number 16 inside.

The two pages inside the enclosure contain a single wide black-and-white photograph of the band on horseback and facing the photographer.  Above the band members and against a background of trees are lists of the contents of and credits for the release.

Track listing

Disc one
First set:
 "Good Morning Little Schoolgirl" (Sonny Boy Williamson)  – 13:33
 "Casey Jones" (Jerry Garcia, Robert Hunter)  – 4:51
 "Dire Wolf" (Garcia, Hunter)  – 8:24
 "Easy Wind" (Hunter)  – 9:02
 "China Cat Sunflower" (Garcia, Hunter)  – 3:45 →
 "I Know You Rider" (traditional)  – 5:40 →
 "High Time" (Garcia, Hunter)  – 7:48
 "Mama Tried" (Merle Haggard)  – 3:10
 "Good Lovin'" (Clark, Resnick)  – 9:17
 "Cumberland Blues" (Garcia, Hunter, Phil Lesh)  – 4:19

Disc two
Second set:
 "Dark Star" (Grateful Dead, Hunter)  – 14:09 →
 "The Other One" (Bill Kreutzmann, Bob Weir)  – 12:02 →
 "Dark Star" (Grateful Dead, Hunter)  – 1:00 →
 "Uncle John's Band Jam" (Garcia, Hunter)  – 2:33 →
 "Dark Star" (Grateful Dead, Hunter)  – 3:05 →
 "St. Stephen" (Garcia, Hunter, Lesh)  – 7:44 →
 "The Eleven" (Hunter, Lesh)  – 14:01 →

Disc three
Second set, continued:
 "Caution (Do Not Stop on Tracks)" (Garcia, Kreutzmann, Lesh, Weir)  – 17:28 →
 "The Main Ten" (Hart)  – 3:10 →
 "Caution (Do Not Stop on Tracks)" (Garcia, Kreutzmann, Lesh, Weir)  – 9:02 →
 "Feedback" (Grateful Dead)  – 7:57 →
 "We Bid You Goodnight" (traditional)  – 3:28
November 7, 1969:
 "Turn on Your Love Light" (Malone, Scott)  – 25:29

Personnel
Grateful Dead:
 Tom Constanten – keyboards
 Jerry Garcia – lead guitar, vocals
 Mickey Hart – drums
 Bill Kreutzmann – drums
 Phil Lesh – bass, vocals
 Ron "Pigpen" McKernan – harmonica, percussion, vocals
 Bob Weir – rhythm guitar, vocals
Production:
 Dick Latvala, David Lemieux – tape archivists
 Gecko Graphics – design
 Owsley Stanley  – recording
 Jeffrey Norman – CD mastering
 John Cutler – magnetic scrutinizer
 Rosie McGee – photography
 Jim Wise – additional editing

See also
 Dick's Picks series
 Grateful Dead discography

References

16
Albums recorded at the Fillmore
2000 live albums